Brezovica may refer to:

Croatia 
 Brezovica, Osijek-Baranja County, a settlement in the municipality of Marijanci
 Brezovica, Virovitica-Podravina County, a village in Gradina, Virovitica-Podravina County
 Brezovica, Zagreb, a city district of Zagreb
 Brezovica Forest, headquarters for the 1st Sisak Partisan Detachment in occupied Yugoslavia
 Brezovica Žumberačka, a settlement in the Ozalj municipality, Karlovac County

Kosovo 
 Brezovica, Kosovo, a settlement in the Municipality of Štrpce, Kosovo
 Brezovica ski resort, a ski resort

Montenegro 
 Brezovica, an alternate name for Beška (Island), in Lake Skadar

Serbia 
 Brezovica, Čačak, a village in Moravica District
 Brezovica, Gornji Milanovac, a village in Moravica District
 Brezovica, Ub, a village in Kolubara District
 Brezovica, Vlasotince, a village in Jablanica District
 Brezovica, Trstenik, a village in Rasina District
 Nova Brezovica, a village in the municipality of Vranje, Pčinja District
 Stara Brezovica, a village in the municipality of Vranje, Pčinja District

Slovakia 
 Brezovica, Sabinov, a village and municipality in Prešov Region
 Brezovica, Tvrdošín, a village and municipality in Žilina Region

Slovenia 
 Blatna Brezovica, a village in the Municipality of Vrhnika, Inner Carniola
 Brezovica na Bizeljskem, a village in the Municipality of Brežiče, Styria
 Brezovica pri Borovnici, a village in the Municipality of Borovnica, Inner Carniola
 Brezovica pri Črmošnjicah, a village in the Municipality of Semič, Lower Carniola
 Brezovica pri Dobu, a village in the Municipality of Domžale, Upper Carniola
 Brezovica pri Gradinu, a village in the Municipality of Koper, Littoral
 Brezovica pri Ljubljani, a village in the Municipality of Brezovica, Inner Carniola
 Brezovica pri Medvodah, a village in the Municipality of Medvode, Upper Carniola
 Brezovica pri Metliki, a village in the Municipality of Metlika, White Carniola
 Brezovica pri Mirni, a village in the Municipality of Mirna, Lower Carniola
 Brezovica pri Predgradu, a village in the Municipality of Kočevje, Lower Carniola
 Brezovica pri Stopičah, a village in the Municipality of Novo Mesto, Lower Carniola
 Brezovica pri Trebelnem, a village in the Municipality of Mokronog-Trebelno, Lower Carniola
 Brezovica pri Zlatem Polju, a village in the Municipality of Lukovica, Upper Carniola
 Brezovica v Podbočju, a village in the Municipality of Krško, Lower Carniola
 Brezovica, Hrpelje-Kozina, a village in the Municipality of Hrpelje-Kozina, Littoral
 Brezovica, Radovljica, a village in the Municipality of Radovljica, Upper Carniola
 Brezovica, Šmarješke Toplice, a village in the Municipality of Šmarješke Toplice, Lower Carniola
 Brezovica, Velika Polana, a village in the Municipality of Velika Polana, Prekmurje
 Brezovica, Zagorje ob Savi, a former village in the Municipality of Zagorje ob Savi, Upper Carniola, now part of Tirna
 Dolenja Brezovica, Brezovica, a village in the Municipality of Brezovica, Inner Carniola
 Dolenja Brezovica, Šentjernej, a village in the Municipality of Šentjernej, Lower Carniola
 Gorenja Brezovica, Brezovica, a village in the Municipality of Brezovica, Inner Carniola
 Gorenja Brezovica, Šentjernej, a village in the Municipality of Šentjernej, Lower Carniola
 Municipality of Brezovica, Inner Carniola

See also 
 Brezovice (disambiguation)
 Breza (disambiguation)